Hold may refer to:

Physical spaces
 Hold (ship), interior cargo space
 Baggage hold, cargo space on an airplane
 Stronghold, a castle or other fortified place

Arts, entertainment, and media
 Hold (musical term), a pause, also called a Fermata
 "Hold" (song), a song by Vera Blue
 "Hold", a song by Axium from Blindsided
 "Hold", a song by Saves the Day from I'm Sorry I'm Leaving
 Hold, in a card game (e.g., blackjack or poker, the cards that are kept in a hand, not those discarded and replaced
 Handhold (dance), a type of hold in dance
 Hold (novel) a novel by Michael Donkor

Law
 Legal hold, a legal ruling or official declaration
 Senate hold, a US parliamentary procedure

Sports
 Hold (baseball), a statistic that may be awarded to a relief pitcher
 Climbing hold, on climbing walls
 Grappling hold, a specific grip applied to an opponent in wrestling or martial arts

Technology
 Hold (aviation), a manoeuvre designed to delay an aircraft already in flight while keeping it within a specified airspace
 Hold (telephone), a condition wherein a call is not terminated, but the connection is held and no speech can take place 
 Authorization hold, a now common practice by bankers and retailers (especially gas stations)

Other uses
 Hold (title), an ancient Anglo-Danish and Norwegian title
 holD, a bacterial gene
Hold or on hold, library books or other borrowed materials reserved for a particular borrower's use 
 Marianne Hold (1933–1994), German actress
 Trevor Hold (1939-2004), English composer, poet and author

See also
 
 
 Holder (disambiguation)
 Holding (disambiguation)
 To Have and to Hold (disambiguation)